Notogomphus cottarellii is a species of dragonfly in the family Gomphidae. It is endemic to Ethiopia.  Its natural habitats are subtropical or tropical high-altitude grassland and rivers. It is threatened by habitat loss.

References

Endemic fauna of Ethiopia
Gomphidae
Insects of Ethiopia
Taxonomy articles created by Polbot
Insects described in 1978